Thomas Raynalde (fl. 1540–1551) was an English physician, known as the translator or editor of Eucharius Rösslin's De Partu Hominis. A Compendious Declaration of the Excellent Vertues of a Certain Lateli Inventid Oile, published in 1551, is believed to have been written by the same person.

Little is known of his life, but it is now thought that Raynalde was a different person from the printer of the translation, of the almost identical name Thomas Raynald(e).

References

External links

16th-century English medical doctors
English translators
Latin–English translators
Year of death unknown
Year of birth unknown